Sara Haden (born Catherine Haden, November 17, 1898 – September 15, 1981) was an American actress of the 1930s through the 1950s and in television into the mid-1960s. She may be best remembered for appearing as Aunt Milly Forrest in 14 entries in the Metro-Goldwyn-Mayer Andy Hardy film series.

Early life
Some sources say she was born in 1898 in Center Point, Texas, while others claim she was born in Galveston, Texas, the daughter of Dr. John Brannum Haden (1871–1910) and character actress, Charlotte Walker, later active in silent films and early sound films. She always was cast in character roles. After their parents' divorce, Haden and her elder sister Beatrice Shelton Haden (born 1897) attended Sacred Heart Academy in Galveston, where they boarded during school terms.

Career

Haden first appeared on the stage in the early 1920s. As early as October 1920, she was appearing with Walter Hampden's acting troupe. Her Broadway debut came in Trigger (1927).

She made her film debut in 1934 (one year after her mother's retirement) in the Katharine Hepburn vehicle Spitfire. Haden later became a Metro-Goldwyn-Mayer contract player in the late 1930s and had smallish roles in many of the studio's films, most notably in the Andy Hardy series starring Mickey Rooney, cast as the spinsterish Aunt Milly Forrest.

Haden made her last film, Andy Hardy Comes Home, in 1958, but was active on television until a 1965 guest spot on Dr. Kildare. She was most notable for her stern, humorless characterisations such as a truant officer in Shirley Temple's Captain January (1936), but she also played the much-loved teacher Miss Pipps, who is unjustly fired in the Our Gang comedy Come Back, Miss Pipps (1941). Other films in which she appeared include Poor Little Rich Girl (1936), The Shop Around the Corner (1940), Woman of the Year (1942), and The Bishop's Wife (1947). Her television appearances include episodes of Climax!, Bourbon Street Beat, and Bonanza. She had a guest appearance on Perry Mason as Florence Harvey in the 1959 episode, "The Case of the Romantic Rogue".

Haden played Dora Darling in My Favorite Martian, season 2 episode 28, "Once Upon a Martian's Mother's Day" in 1965.

Personal life
Haden was married to film actor Richard Abbott (born Seamon Vandenberg) from 1921 until their divorce in 1948. She died on September 15, 1981, at the Motion Picture & Television Country House and Hospital in Woodland Hills, California, at age 82.

Selected filmography

 The Life of Vergie Winters (1934) as Winnie Belle
 Music in the Air (1934) as Martha
 Anne of Green Gables (1934) as Mrs. Barry
 The White Parade (1934) as Miss Harrington
 The Fountain (1934) as Susie
 Hat, Coat, and Glove (1934) as The Secretary
 Finishing School (1934) as Miss Fisher - Teacher
 Affairs of a Gentleman (1934) as Frances Bennett - Grisham's secretary
 Spitfire (1934) as Etta Dawson
 Black Fury (1935) as Sophie Shemanski
 Magnificent Obsession (1935) as Mrs. Nancy Ashford
 Way Down East (1935) as Cordelia Peabody
 O'Shaughnessy's Boy (1935) as Aunt Martha Shields
 Mad Love (1935) as Marie
 Reunion (1936) as Ellie
 Laughing at Trouble (1936) as Mrs. Jennie Nevins
 Can This Be Dixie? (1936) as Miss Beauregard
 Poor Little Rich Girl (1936) as Collins
 Little Miss Nobody (1936) as Teresa Lewis
 Half Angel (1936) as Henrietta Hargraves
 Captain January (1936) as Agatha Morgan
 Everybody's Old Man (1936) as Susan Franklin 
 The Crime of Dr. Forbes (1936) as Dr. Anna Burkhart
 Under Cover of Night (1937) as Janet Griswald
 A Family Affair (1937) as Aunt Milly Forrest
 You're Only Young Once (1937) as Aunt Milly Forrest
 First Lady (1937) as Mrs. Mason
 The Barrier (1937) as Mrs. John "Allunia" Gale
 The Last of Mrs. Cheyney (1937) as Anna
 Out West with the Hardys (1938) as Aunt Milly Forrest
 Judge Hardy and Son (1939) as Aunt Milly Forrest
 Remember? (1939) as Miss Wilson
 The Secret of Dr. Kildare (1939) as Nora
 Andy Hardy Gets Spring Fever (1939) as Aunt Milly Forrest
 Tell No Tales (1939) as Miss Bennett
 The Hardys Ride High (1939) as Aunt Milly Forrest
 Four Girls in White (1939) as Miss Bennett
 The Shop Around the Corner (1940) as Flora Kaczek
 Boom Town (1940) as Miss Barnes
 Hullabaloo (1940) as "Sue" Merriweather
 Keeping Company (1940) as Mrs. Forrest
 Andy Hardy Meets Debutante (1940) as Aunt Milly Forrest
 H. M. Pulham, Esq. (1941) as Miss Rollo - Harry's secretary
 Come Back, Miss Pipps (1941 - Our Gang short) as Miss Pipps
 Life Begins for Andy Hardy (1941) as Aunt Milly Forrest
 Love Crazy (1941) as Cecila Landis
 Washington Melodrama (1941) as Mrs. Harrington
 Barnacle Bill (1941) as Aunt Letty
 Andy Hardy's Private Secretary (1941) as Aunt Milly Forrest
 The Trial of Mary Dugan (1941) as Miss Mathews
 Andy Hardy's Double Life (1942) as Aunt Milly Forrest
 Somewhere I'll Find You (1942) as Miss Coultier
 The Affairs of Martha (1942) as Mrs. Justin I. Peacock
 The Courtship of Andy Hardy (1942) as Aunt Milly Forrest
 Woman of the Year (1942) as Matron
 Thousands Cheer (1943) as Second Nurse
 Best Foot Forward (1943) as Miss Talbert
 Pilot No. 5 (1943) as Landlady
 Above Suspecion (1943) as Aunt Hattie
 The Youngest Profession (1943) as Sister Lassie
 Lost Angel (1943) as Rhoda Kitterick
 Broadway Rhythm (1944) as Miss Wynn
 Andy Hardy's Blonde Trouble (1944) as Aunt Milly Forrest
 She Wouldn't Say Yes (1945) as Laura Pitts
 Our Vines Have Tender Grapes(1945) as Mrs. Bjorn Bjornson
 Love Laughs at Andy Hardy (1946) as Aunt Milly Forrest
 Mr. Ace (1946) as Alma Rhodes
 Our Hearts Were Growing Up (1946) as Miss Dill
 Bad Bascomb (1946) as Tillie Lovejoy
 She-Wolf of London (1946) as Martha Winthrop
 The Bishop's Wife (1947) as Mildred Cassaway
 Rachel and the Stranger (1948) as Mrs. Jackson
 Roughshod (1949) as Ma Wyatt
 The Big Cat (1949) as Mrs. Mary Cooper
 A Life of Her Own (1950) as Smitty
 The Great Rupert (1950) as Mrs. Katie Dingle
 Wagons West (1952) as Elizabeth Cook
 Rodeo (1952) as Agatha Cartwright
 A Lion Is in the Streets (1953) as Lula May McManamee
 The Outlaw's Daughter (1954) as Mrs. Merril
 Betrayed Women (1955) as Head Guard Darcy
 Andy Hardy Comes Home (1958) as Aunt Milly Forest

Notes

References

External links

1898 births
1981 deaths
Actresses from Texas
American film actresses
American stage actresses
American television actresses
Metro-Goldwyn-Mayer contract players
People from Galveston, Texas
20th-century American actresses